Johann Michael Bach (9 November 1745 in Struth near Schmalkalden – 13 June 1820 in Elberfeld) was a German composer, lawyer and music theorist.

He was a son of Johann Elias Bach (1705–1755), and therefore a nephew of J. S. Bach. He is not to be confused with his great uncle Johann Michael Bach (1648–1694, brother of Johann Christoph Bach).
 He was active as a lawyer in Güstrow (Mecklenburg), then a music teacher at the high school in Elberfeld, Wuppertal.

His main theoretical work was his Kurze und systematische Anleitung zum General-Bass und der Tonkunst uberhaupt published at Kassel in 1780.

Works
Friedens-Cantata; Ingrid Schmithüsen, Howard Crook, Gotthold Schwarz, Klaus Mertens, Hermann Max; cpo 999 671-2, 2000

References

External links
 

German male composers
German composers
Musicians from Leipzig
Johann Michael
18th-century German lawyers
German music theorists
1745 births
1820 deaths